Baileytown is an unincorporated community in northern Jackson County, Alabama, United States, located approximately three miles northwest of Skyline.

References

Unincorporated communities in Alabama
Unincorporated communities in Jackson County, Alabama